Parks Tower (パークスタワー) is a 30- floor-and-149- meter high skyscraper located in the Namba Parks complex in the Namba district, Naniwa-ku, Osaka, Japan.

It was designed by Nikken Sekkei Ltd., and constructed by Takenaka Corporation in 2003. The building later earned the nickname "PS3 Building" in 2010 as it bore a striking resemblance to the original PlayStation 3 console.

See also
List of tallest buildings in Osaka

References

External links

Parks Tower (Japanese)

Skyscrapers in Osaka
Skyscraper office buildings in Japan